William Stuart (7 March 1825 – 21 December 1893), was a British Conservative politician.

A member of the Stuart family headed by the Marquess of Bute, he was the son of Sir William Stuart and his wife Henrietta Mariah Sarah, daughter of Admiral Sir Charles Pole. He was returned to Parliament for Bedford in 1854, a seat he held until 1857 and again from 1859 to 1868. Apart from his political career Stuart was also a Justice of the Peace for Hertfordshire, Huntingdonshire and Bedfordshire, a Deputy Lieutenant of Bedfordshire and High Sheriff of Bedfordshire in 1875. He resided at Tempsford Hall, Bedfordshire, and Aldenham Abbey, Hertfordshire.

Stuart married Katherine, daughter of John Armytage Nicholson, in 1859. They had several children. She died in October 1881. Stuart survived her by twelve years and died in December 1893, aged 68.

References

External links 
 

Stuart (1825-1893), William
Stuart (1825-1893), William
William
Conservative Party (UK) MPs for English constituencies
UK MPs 1852–1857
UK MPs 1859–1865
UK MPs 1865–1868
Deputy Lieutenants of Bedfordshire
High Sheriffs of Bedfordshire